Malakoff Diggins State Historic Park is a state park unit preserving the largest hydraulic mining site in California, United States. The mine was one of several hydraulic mining sites at the center of the 1882 landmark case Woodruff v. North Bloomfield Mining and Gravel Company. The mine pit and several Gold Rush-era buildings are listed on the National Register of Historic Places as the Malakoff Diggins-North Bloomfield Historic District. Visitors can see huge cliffs carved by mighty streams of water, results of the mining technique of washing away entire mountains of gravel to wash out the gold. The park is a  drive north-east of Nevada City, California, in the Gold Rush country. The  park was established in 1965.

History

The Malakoff mine pit on the San Juan Ridge is the impetus for one of the nation's first environmental protection measures. 
 
In 1850 there was little gold left in streams. Miners began to discover gold in old riverbeds and on mountainsides high above the streams. In 1851 three miners headed northeast of what is now Nevada City for a less crowded area to prospect. One miner went back to town with a pocket full of gold nuggets for supplies and was followed back by many prospectors. These followers, however, did not find any gold and declared the area "Humbug", thus the stream was so named "Humbug Creek". Around 1852, settlers began to arrive in the area and the town of "Humbug" sprang up. These miners could not decide how to move the dirt to a place where there was water.

By 1853 miners invented a new method of mining called hydraulic mining. Dams were built high in the mountains. The water ran swiftly to the canvas hoses and nozzles called monitors waiting in the old riverbeds. The miners would aim the monitors at the hillsides to wash the gravel into huge sluices. Over time the monitors became bigger and more powerful. Their force was so great they could toss a fifty-pound rock like a cannonball or even kill a person. Over 300 Chinese worked on this project and two Chinese settlements existed in North Bloomfield.

By 1857 the town had grown to 500 residents. Locals felt the name "Humbug" was too undignified and renamed the town "Bloomfield", but California already had a town by this name so they renamed the town "North Bloomfield".

In the late 1860s the towns of Marysville and Yuba City were buried under  of mud and rock, and Sacramento flooded repeatedly.  The farmers in the valleys complained about the tailings that flooded their land and ruined their crops. Thousands of acres of rich farmland and property were destroyed as a result of hydraulic mining.

By 1876 the mine was in full operation with 7 giant water cannons working around the clock. The town had grown to a population of around 2000 with various business and daily stage service.  In 1880 electric lights were installed in the mine and the world's first long-distance telephone line was developed to service the mine, passing through North Bloomfield as it made its way from French Corral to Bowman Lake.

By 1883 San Francisco Bay was estimated to be filling with silt at a rate of one foot per year.  Debris, silt, and millions of gallons of water used daily by the mine caused extensive flooding, prompting Sacramento valley farmers to file the lawsuit Woodruff v. North Bloomfield Mining and Gravel Company. On January 7, 1884, Judge Lorenzo Sawyer declared hydraulic mining illegal.

Climate
Weather can change rapidly any time of the year. Rain and snow fall usually from October until April, though there may be thunderstorm activity in the summer as well.

North Bloomfield
The visitor center has exhibits depicting life in the old mining town of North Bloomfield, with a past population of 1,500 that served as a supply base for the Diggins. About a block of buildings, some dating to the 1850s, are restored or re-created in a Gold Rush style, including white picket fences. One of the buildings is used as park headquarters and there is a museum with old artifacts, and a model showing how hydraulics worked. In summer, park rangers lead tours through a general store, a furnished home, and a drugstore whose shelves are lined with bottles, boxes and vials of medicines. A church, schoolhouse and other buildings are also part of the tour.

Park facilities include hiking trails, picnic area, swimming and fishing, a campground and rustic cabins that can be rented by campers. 
 
Humbug Days, including a parade and barbecue, is an annual event.

Hiking and trails

Visitors to the state historic park can hike on miles of trails. The mining pit is unfenced and accessible from the road and pathways that surround it. Hikers can enter the  Hiller Tunnel, through which water for the mining operation once flowed. The park also contains a  bedrock tunnel that served as a drain. Other hiking includes:
 Rim Trail
 Diggins Loop Trail
 Blair Trail
 North Bloomfield Trail

Proposed for closure
Malakoff Diggins was one of 70 California state parks proposed for closure by July 2012 as part of a deficit reduction program.  It was previously one of many state parks threatened with closure in 2008.  Those closures were ultimately avoided by cutting hours and maintenance system-wide.

See also
 List of California state parks

References

Further reading
Huerne, P. (1877). Examination of the grand channel of auriferous gravel in the mining district of North Bloomfield, Nevada County, California. San Francisco: E. Bosqui & Co., printers. 
Wright, H. (1966). Some information and sources for the Fourier community of North Bloomfield, circa 1840. 
Jackson, W. T. (1967). Report on the Malakoff Mine, the North Bloomfield Mining District, and the town of North Bloomfield. Sacramento, Calif: Division of Beaches and Parks, Dept. of Parks and Recreation. 
California. (1979). Survey of cultural resources at Malakoff Diggins State Historic Park. Sacramento, CA: State of California, Resources Agency, Dept. of Parks and Recreation. 
Senter, E. (1987). Erosion control at Malakoff Diggins State Historic Park. Sacramento: State of California, Resources Agency, Dept. of Water Resources, Central District. 
Payen, L. A. (1989). Archaeological excavations at Shoot Hill, Malakoff Diggins State Historic Park, Nevada County, California, 1987 field season. Riverside, Calif: University of California, Riverside, Dept. of Anthropology. 
Lindström, S. (1990). A historic sites archaeological survey of the main hydraulic pit basin, Malakoff Diggins State Historic Park, North Bloomfield, Nevada County, California. Berkeley, Calif.?: S. Lindström?.
Wyckoff, R. M. (1993). Hydraulicking North Bloomfield and the Malakoff Diggins State Historic Park. Nevada City, Calif. U.S.A.: R.M. Wyckoff.

External links

 Official Malakoff Diggins State Historic Park website

California State Historic Parks
California Gold Rush
Mining museums in California
Museums in Nevada County, California
Parks in Nevada County, California
Open-air museums in California
Historic districts on the National Register of Historic Places in California
National Register of Historic Places in Nevada County, California
Protected areas of the Sierra Nevada (United States)
Protected areas established in 1965
1965 establishments in California